The History of The Hobbit is a two-volume study of J. R. R. Tolkien's 1937 novel The Hobbit. It was published by HarperCollins in May and June 2007 in the United Kingdom, with both volumes released in the United States by Houghton Mifflin on 21 September 2007; a boxed set combining The Hobbit with The History of The Hobbit was released on 26 October 2007. A single-volume edition was released on 27 October 2011.

The two-volume work contains Tolkien's unpublished drafts of the novel, with commentary by John D. Rateliff. It also details Tolkien's various revisions to The Hobbit, including abandoned revisions for the unpublished third edition of the work, intended for 1960, as well as previously unpublished original maps and illustrations drawn by Tolkien himself.

Publication history

The History of The Hobbit: Volume I: Mr. Baggins. This contains the first half of Tolkien's draft material for The Hobbit, along with commentary. It was published in the UK on 4 May 2007.

The History of The Hobbit: Volume II: Return to Bag-End, contains the second half of Tolkien's original manuscript draft, with commentary and later drafts and appendices. It was published in the UK on 18 June 2007.

Relationship to The History of Middle-earth

When Christopher Tolkien began publishing The History of Middle-earth, a 12-volume series documenting J. R. R. Tolkien's writing process in the creation of Middle-earth, with texts dating from the 1910s to the 1990s, he made a conscious decision not to issue a volume detailing the creation of The Hobbit. According to him, The Hobbit was not originally a part of his father's earlier legendarium and was attached to it only retrospectively, although the existence of The Hobbit forever altered the legendarium.

As Christopher Tolkien was not going to embark on a published study of The Hobbit, the task was given to Taum Santoski in the 1980s. Santoski had connections to the Marquette collection of Tolkien material, which is where the original manuscripts reside. He died in 1991, and ultimately the task passed to the Inklings scholar John D. Rateliff. Although Christopher Tolkien did not work directly on The History of The Hobbit, the work is in a very similar vein to the "literary archaeology" of his History of Middle-earth.

Rateliff submitted a finished draft of the book to Christopher Tolkien, who, approving of the work, allowed The History of The Hobbit to be published in association with his father's other works.

Reception

The Tolkien scholar Tom Shippey welcomed the book, noting that until its appearance, the best-known history of The Hobbit was contained in Humphrey Carpenter's biography of Tolkien, which was clear, famous, and left several questions unanswered. Rateliff's account goes into much greater detail.

Jason Fisher, reviewing the book for Mythlore, said it was worth the very long wait (from 1991), describing the account as "riveting". The book had three purposes: to present the earliest manuscript version; to show that it was, pace Christopher Tolkien, connected to the tradition of The Silmarillion; and to examine both Tolkien's revision of 1947 giving the familiar text, and his abandoned 1960 rewrite, which would have refashioned the whole book "to bring it into greater harmony with the mood, language, and geography of The Lord of the Rings." Fisher describes the books' layout as "meticulously systematic" and comparable to Christopher Tolkien's History of Middle-earth. He finds  the book rich in "wonderful surprises", among them that Thorin Oakenshield would have been Gandalf the Dwarf, while the Wizard of that name would have been called Bladorthin; and Tolkien considered having Bilbo Baggins the hobbit navigate Mirkwood using a ball of rolled-up spider silk "like Theseus in the Minotaur's labyrinth". He enjoyed, too, the appendices with previously unpublished illustrations, including a facsimile of the Dwarves' letter which Bilbo found under the clock on his mantelpiece. For Fisher, however, the most interesting addition was the unfinished 1960 rewrite of the first three chapters, adding detail of passing through Bree, for example, but losing much of the humour. In his view, it was just as well that Tolkien abandoned the attempt. He was more critical of Rateliff's essays, which he found generally but not uniformly illuminating and erudite. All the same, the book was in his view ambitious, brilliant, and indispensable.

See also

 The Lord of the Rings

References

Middle-earth books
Books about Middle-earth
The Hobbit
2007 non-fiction books
Books published posthumously
HarperCollins books